William M. "Rocky" Rees (June 9, 1949 – December 20, 2018) was an American football player and coach.  Rees served as the head football coach at Susquehanna University from 1985 to 1989 and at Shippensburg University of Pennsylvania from 1990 to 2010, compiling a career college football record of 159–125–2.

Rees grew up in Morristown, New Jersey and was captain of the football team at Bayley-Ellard High School.

Head coaching record

College

References

External links
 Shippensburg profile

1949 births
2018 deaths
American football running backs
Bucknell Bison football coaches
Colgate Raiders football coaches
Shippensburg Red Raiders football coaches
Susquehanna River Hawks football coaches
West Chester Golden Rams football coaches
West Chester Golden Rams football players
High school football coaches in Delaware
People from Madison, New Jersey
People from Morristown, New Jersey
Coaches of American football from New Jersey
Players of American football from New Jersey